Theodore Schwinden (born August 31, 1925) is an American politician. He served as the 23rd Lieutenant Governor of Montana and the 19th Governor of Montana.

Biography
Schwinden was born in Wolf Point, Montana. He enlisted in the United States Army and served until 1946. Schwinden earned a Bachelor's Degree and a Master's Degree from the University of Montana.

Career
A member of the Democratic Party, Schwinden was elected to the Montana House of Representatives in 1958. He was elected and was named to the Legislative Council in 1959. He served as the House minority whip in 1961. In 1965, he was elected president of the Grain Growers Association, and in 1969 he was named Commissioner of State Lands, He was reappointed in 1973 and served until April 1976. Schwinden resigned to campaign for Lieutenant Governor and was elected the 23rd Lieutenant Governor of Montana, serving under Governor Thomas Lee Judge. He served as Lieutenant Governor from 1976 to 1980.

Schwinden defeated his predecessor in the Democratic primary in 1980 to become the 19th Governor of Montana. He was re-elected governor in 1984. Hallmarks of Schwinden's governorship were his "Build Montana" economic plan and popular traveling "Capital for a Day" events.

Personal life
His wife, former Montana First Lady Jean Schwinden, died from cancer on March 24, 2007, at the age of 81. Schwinden and his wife have three children.

References

External links
 National Governors Association
 Montana Historical Society
 The Political Graveyard
 

1925 births
Living people
People from Wolf Point, Montana
University of Montana alumni
Democratic Party members of the Montana House of Representatives
Democratic Party governors of Montana
Lieutenant Governors of Montana
American Lutherans
Military personnel from Montana
United States Army personnel of World War II